Love Affair is an unreleased Indian Bollywood biographical film directed by Soni Razdan under the T-Series and Fish Eye Network Pvt Ltd banners. The principal photography of the film commenced in January 2016.

Plot
The film is based on the 1959 Nanavati murder case. The story revolves around K M Nanavati.

Cast
Ali Fazal as Kawas Manekshaw Nanavati
Kalki Koechlin as Sylvia Nanavati
Gulshan Devaiah as Prem Bhagwan Ahuja
Chandan Roy Sanyal as Ram Jethmalani 
Karishma Kotak as Mamie Ahuja
Hansika Motwani
Soni Razdan

References

External links
 

Unreleased Hindi-language films
Indian biographical films
Films shot in Mumbai
T-Series (company) films